The Blues is a 2003 documentary film series produced by Martin Scorsese, dedicated to the history of blues music. In each of the seven episodes, a different director explores a stage in the development of the blues. The series originally aired on PBS (Public Broadcasting Service) in the United States.

Feel Like Going Home

Director Martin Scorsese pays tribute to the Delta blues, tracing the roots of the music by traveling through the state of Mississippi with the musician Corey Harris and then traveling to West Africa. Willie King, Taj Mahal, Othar Turner and Ali Farka Touré give performances of early Delta blues songs, along with rare archival film of Son House, Muddy Waters, and John Lee Hooker.

The Soul of a Man

Written and directed by Wim Wenders, the film explores the musical careers of blues musicians Skip James, Blind Willie Johnson and J. B. Lenoir.

The Road to Memphis

Directed by Richard Pearce, this episode focuses on the Beale Street music scene, particularly three Memphis blues musicians with different levels of acclaim: B. B. King, Rosco Gordon and Bobby Rush.

Warming by the Devil's Fire

Written and directed by Charles Burnett, this film presents the tale of a young boy traveling to Mississippi to visit relatives. He is caught between the pressures of his religious mother and gospel music, and the eagerness of his blues-loving uncle. The film includes performance by
Big Bill Broonzy
Elizabeth Cotten
Reverend Gary Davis
Ida Cox
Willie Dixon
Jesse Fuller
John Lee Hooker
Lightnin' Hopkins
Son House
Mississippi John Hurt
Vasti Jackson
Bessie Smith
Mamie Smith
Victoria Spivey
Sister Rosetta Tharpe
Dinah Washington
Muddy Waters
Sonny Boy Williamson

Godfathers and Sons

Director Marc Levin follows Marshall Chess as he remembers his father's contribution to Chicago blues history as the co-founder of Chess Records and his own production of the controversial album Electric Mud. He organizes a reunion of the musicians that made Electric Mud to record new versions of Muddy Waters's blues standard "Mannish Boy", with contributions by hip hop artists, including Chuck D of Public Enemy, Common & Kyle Jason.

Red, White and Blues

Directed by Mike Figgis, this episode is dedicated to blues culture in Britain and to the effect of the British Invasion on American blues culture. It contains footage from a jam session and interviews with the musicians Jeff Beck, Van Morrison and others.

Piano Blues

Directed by Clint Eastwood, this episode is dedicated to blues music played on the piano. Eastwood, a piano player and accomplished composer, interviews such key figures as Dr. John, Ray Charles, Jay McShann (shown on the DVD cover), and Pinetop Perkins.

References

External links
"The Blues" - official site

Blues films
Documentary films about blues music and musicians
Films directed by Charles Burnett (director)
Films directed by Clint Eastwood
Films directed by Marc Levin
Films directed by Martin Scorsese
Films directed by Mike Figgis
Films directed by Wim Wenders
Films scored by Stephen James Taylor